Reinhold Poss (11 September 1897 – 26 August 1933) was a German flying ace and racing pilot. Poss enlisted with the Imperial German Navy during World War I and scored eleven kills as a naval pilot. In May 1918 he took command of the Seefrontstaffel and in September 1918 of the IV. Marinefeldjasta, which he led until 15 October, when he was shot down and captured. He spent the final month of the war in a POW camp.

Following the war, Poss achieved further fame as a pilot, completing, with Hermann Köhl, the first night-time flight between Warnemünde and Stockholm, Sweden. Poss competed in three Fédération Aéronautique Internationale air races, Challenge 1929 (finishing 15/16th overall), Challenge 1930 (2nd overall), and Challenge 1932 (tying Fritz Morzik for 2/3rd).

On 26 August 1933, Poss and his copilot, Paul Weirich, crashed after striking a church tower while flying near Neuruppin. Neither survived. Poss is buried in the Parkfriedhof of Berlin-Lichterfelde.

See also 
Challenge 1929
Challenge 1930
Challenge 1932
List of World War I flying aces by nationality

External links 
 Reinhold Poss (German)
 Reinhold Poss at The Aerodrome Includes a detailed kill list.

1897 births
1933 deaths
German World War I flying aces
German air racers
Aviators killed in aviation accidents or incidents in Germany
Victims of aviation accidents or incidents in 1933
Imperial German Navy personnel of World War I